Kendenup is a small town in the Great Southern region of Western Australia, within the Shire of Plantagenet. It is known for its view of Porongorup and the Stirling ranges. The Great Southern Railway (established 1889) passes through the town, being one of the original stations on the line. At the 2006 census, Kendenup had a population of 1,290.

The town was once the centre of a vast sheep station, and was, in the early years of the Western Australian colony, one of the largest farming enterprises so far established.

At the time of the first European discovery, the area was known to local Aboriginals as "Moor-ilup". "Kendenup" is another local indigenous word which was used to describe the area.

The upper reach of the Kalgan River runs nearby.

History

Early European settlement 

Alexander Collie led an expedition from King George's Sound (Albany) in April and May 1831 accompanied by the Noongar man Mokare. The expedition commenced by journeying up the Kalgan River and overland to the base of the Porongorups. Collie was granted  in the Kendenup area having been satisfied with its agricultural potential.

Other early land grants in the district were made to:
 John Lawrence Morley, ;
 Lieutenant William Preston, ;
 George Cheyne,  at 'Location 27'
 and in June 1830, Captain Thomas Banister, 

In 1838, Captain John Hassell sailed from England en route to Van Diemen's Land in the Dawson, intending to settle on a  grant on the Tamar River. Running low on water, he stopped at King George Sound in Albany where he met with the Government Resident, Sir Richard Spencer who persuaded him to consider acquiring land in the vicinity. Hassell ultimately purchased George Cheyne's Location 27 and after returning to Hobart and New South Wales, arrived back at Albany on 6 March 1840 in the China which he had chartered for the purpose. His stock included 800 sheep, 12 cattle and 10 horses from New South Wales which he walked overland to establish a homestead and farm which he called "Kendenup". Hassell, who was known widely as Captain Hassell, acquired further properties and by 1850 had expanded the operation to  freehold and  leased.

Hassell's partner and brother-in-law was Frederick Boucher who had established the British and Australian Bank in London in 1838. The bank failed in 1841 and as Boucher's assets were tied in with the collapse, Hassell found himself having to work closely with the bank's trustees as partners. Lieutenant Peter Belches was appointed as the bank's trustees agent to realise on Boucher's assets.

After establishing the farm, Hassell lived mainly in Albany using managers to run the day-to-day operations on the station. In Albany he ran an import/export business which included managing the farm's wool sales to England. He travelled to Kendenup regularly to oversee the business. The Kendenup wool won many awards.

In 1856 the family settled at Kendenup. Captain Hassell's two eldest sons, John Frederick Tasman Hassell and Albert Young Hassell, took control of operations and later married and settled there with their own families. Several homesteads and buildings were built to accommodate the families, some of which still stand and are listed and protected for their heritage value.

In the early 1870s the station boasted 30,000 sheep.

 Hassell left the property to live in Albany in about 1871/72 followed by Albert who ran the farm until 1886. Captain Hassell died on 15 August 1883, survived by his wife, five sons and a daughter. The property stagnated for the next 30 or so years, with  Hassell attempting to sell it 1909. He died in 1919.

Gold 

On 20 July 1869, the Government of Western Australia offered a payment of £5,000 in the Government Gazette for the discovery of payable gold. Hassell submitted stone samples from Kendenup in 1872 and was told that they were gold bearing. A five-ton consignment was sent to Victoria for crushing and returned four ounces of gold.

Encouraged by the prospects, the Standard Gold Mining Company was registered on 15 December 1874, with a capital of £3,000. The operation became the first to start mining in the state. However, recoveries failed to live up to expectations and the battery crushed only ten tons of ore before being closed when the company went into voluntary liquidation on 5 June 1876.

The mine and battery are still visible, although in poor condition.

1920 De Garis settlement 

While in Adelaide in July 1920, rural entrepreneur Jack De Garis had heard that the Kendenup property was for sale by the Hassell family executors for £47,325, or £1 per acre. He offered £45,000 with a £1,000 deposit which was accepted, the offer being made prior to his inspection of the property. After having satisfied himself with an inspection De Garis proceeded with his plan of subdividing it into approximately  lots, selling the lots through the sale of debentures to settlers to the value of £150,000 using a closer settlement model. He also purchased Kendenup East, a  property which included a homestead and a  orchard, for another £1,000.

The "DeGaris Kendenup W.A. Development Company" was set up as the debenture issuer. De Garis planned for subdivision of the estate with a townsite which would include an administrative and civic centre, public parks, recreation areas, factory areas, a school and church sites. A dehydrating factory under the name of Kendenup Fruit Packing Company was established to pack farm produce for the community at a cost of £4,000.

However, the project was under capitalised and lot sizes were considered to be too small to be fully viable and after a peak of about 350 families settling, debenture sales dried up.

In August 1922 De Garis travelled to the United States to raise urgently needed capital. The following classified advertisement was published in the New York Times on 13 August 1922.

$250,000 was promised but never materialised.

By 1923, the scheme had effectively collapsed with the company going into voluntary liquidation. About 30 families stayed on. In order to remain on their selections the Kendenup Settlers Association (Inc.) took up the fight. The government established a Royal Commission 'to inquire into and report upon the establishment of the settlement at Kendenup', headed by Commissioner William Grogan. Fraud by De Garis had been alleged prior to the Royal Commission but he was exonerated in the findings. A second Royal Commission headed by barrister Ross McDonald was held to look into the difficulties faced by the settlers and possible assistance which could be offered. Changes to the Act which governed the Agricultural Bank of Western Australia were made as a result. McDonald later worked pro bono on the settlers' behalf to negotiate with creditors and the banks to enable them to purchase additional land and transfer the debentures to conventional mortgages.

Despite the setbacks, the settlement had provided much of the infrastructure for the current Kendenup township.

Internment camp

During World War II the town was the site of an internment camp housing 200 Italian prisoners of war. The camp operated from 4 November 1943 to 23 May 1946. Internees were assigned as labourers to farms in the area.

Facilities 
The town has the Kendenup Primary School (established 1921).

Businesses nearby and within the town include Ridge Brothers store (liquor store, bakery, gifts and general goods), the local Kendenup post office, scattered wineries and accommodation options such as a lodge and several bed and breakfast establishments.

The early homestead buildings are intact but on private property and therefore unavailable for inspection. The old mine and its battery are about 2 km south of the townsite on Jellicoe Road off Albany Highway.

Climate 

Kendenup has a temperate climate with warm to hot summers and mild to cold winters. Overnight temperatures can drop below  in winter but daytime winter temperatures average .

Kendenup recorded  of rainfall in the 24 hours to 9am on 2 April 2005.

Notable residents

 Rica Erickson, naturalist and author

References

Further reading

External links

Heritage Council of Western Australia listings

Great Southern (Western Australia)